Himayatnagar may refer to:

 Himayatnagar, Hyderabad, a suburb of the city of Hyderabad, Andhra Pradesh, India
 Himayathnagar, Moinabad mandal, a village of Rangareddy District in Andhra Pradesh, India
 Himayatnagar, Maharashtra, a tehsil of Nanded District in Maharashtra, India

See also
 Himayatnagar (disambiguation)